The Yeristovskoye mine is a large iron mine located in central Ukraine in the Poltava Oblast. Yeristovskoye represents one of the largest iron ore reserves in Ukraine and in the world having estimated reserves of 1.19 billion tonnes of ore grading 32% iron metal.

References 

Iron mines in Ukraine